is a bridge in Kyoto, Kyoto Prefecture, Japan. It spans the Kamo River as part of Sanjō-dōri (三条通り Third Avenue). It is well known because it served as the ending location for journeying on both the Nakasendō and the Tōkaidō; these were two of the famous "Five Routes" for long distance travelers during the Edo period in Japan's past.

History
It is unclear when this bridge was first built, but there are records of Toyotomi Hideyoshi orders for it to be repaired in 1590, as well as one of the original giboshi (擬宝珠) (onion-shaped posts that are located on bridges, shrines and temples in Japan).

The current concrete bridge, which includes two lanes for driving and a walking path on either side, was built in 1950.

Neighboring post towns
Nakasendō & Tōkaidō
Ōtsu-juku - Sanjō Ōhashi (ending location)

References

Stations of the Nakasendō
Stations of the Tōkaidō
Bridges in Japan
Buildings and structures in Kyoto